Giorgi Talakhadze (born August 24, 1994) is a Georgian rugby union player. His position is centre, and he currently plays for Lelo Saracens in the Georgia Championship and the Georgia national team.

References

Rugby union locks
Rugby union players from Georgia (country)
Living people
1994 births
Rugby union players from Tbilisi
Georgia international rugby union players